Holleton Important Bird Area is a tract of land in the eastern wheatbelt region of Western Australia about 290 km east of Perth.

Description
The 322 km2 site represents one of the largest areas of continuous Acacia and Allocasuarina shrublands left within the wheatbelt.  It also contains eucalypt woodlands.  The area has cool winters and hot dry summers, with an annual rainfall of about 300 mm.

Birds
It has been identified by BirdLife International as an Important Bird Area (IBA) because it contains habitat for the vulnerable malleefowl as well four bird species restricted to the mallee and south-western biome, the blue-breasted fairywren, rufous treecreeper, western yellow robin and purple-gaped honeyeater.

References

Wheatbelt (Western Australia)
Important Bird Areas of Western Australia